Tayebeh Safaei is an Iranian conservative politician who served as member of the Parliament of Iran from 2008 to 2012, representing Tehran, Rey, Shemiranat and Eslamshahr. She was head of the women's fraction and vice of the education and research commission.

Views
Safaei is an opponent of gender equality, having said “Instead of talking about gender equality, we need to talk about gender justice. Because these imbalances can lead to social crises.” She supports sex segregation and “Islamicising universities”, and calls for examination of university professors and textbooks in accordance with Islam.

References

1960 births
Living people
Members of the 8th Islamic Consultative Assembly
Deputies of Tehran, Rey, Shemiranat and Eslamshahr
Front of Islamic Revolution Stability politicians
Islamic Republican Party politicians
Members of the Women's fraction of Islamic Consultative Assembly
Academic staff of the Islamic Azad University, Central Tehran Branch
Coalition of the Pleasant Scent of Servitude politicians
21st-century Iranian women politicians
21st-century Iranian politicians